Jan-Erik Thorn is a Swedish ski-orienteering competitor and world champion. He received a silver medal in the classic distance at the World Ski Orienteering Championships in Avesta in 1980, and received a gold medal with the Swedish relay team.

References

Year of birth missing (living people)
Living people
Swedish orienteers
Male orienteers
Ski-orienteers